Bader Najem (born 20 August 1980) is a Kuwaiti footballer. He competed in the men's tournament at the 2000 Summer Olympics in Sydney.

References

External links
 

1980 births
Living people
Kuwaiti footballers
Kuwait international footballers
Olympic footballers of Kuwait
Footballers at the 2000 Summer Olympics
Place of birth missing (living people)
Association football midfielders
Kuwait Premier League players
Al-Nasr SC (Kuwait) players
Qadsia SC players
Al-Muharraq SC players
Bahraini Premier League players
Kuwaiti expatriate sportspeople in Bahrain
Kuwaiti expatriate footballers
Expatriate footballers in Bahrain